Keith Coble is an American agricultural economist focusing on risk management, food and agricultural policy, renewable energy, insurance, climate, and experimental economics.  He is currently a W. L. Giles Distinguished Professor at Mississippi State University.

References

Year of birth missing (living people)
Living people
Mississippi State University faculty
Texas A&M University alumni
University of Missouri alumni
Economists from Texas